Äetsä is a former municipality of southwestern Finland. The municipality was founded on 1981 when municipalities of Keikyä and Kiikka were consolidated to a single municipality.

On 1 January 2009, it was consolidated with the municipalities of Vammala and Mouhijärvi to form a new city of Sastamala.

Geography
Äetsä was located in the western Pirkanmaa region, and was part of the former (1997 to 2010) province of Western Finland.

Demographics

The municipality was unilingually Finnish.

External links 

Äetsä area map

Sastamala
Former municipalities of Finland
Populated places established in 1981
Populated places disestablished in 2009
2009 disestablishments in Finland